The 2008–09 Cypriot Cup was the 67th edition of the Cypriot Cup. A total of 28 clubs entered the competition. It began on 23 September 2008 with the first round and concluded on 16 May 2009 with the final which was held at GSP Stadium. APOP Kinyras won their 1st Cypriot Cup trophy after beating AEL 2–0 in the final.

Format
In the 2008–09 Cypriot Cup, participated all the teams of the Cypriot First Division and the Cypriot Second Division. Teams from the two lower divisions (Third and Fourth) competed in a separate cup competition.

The competition consisted of five rounds. All rounds, except the final, were played in a two-legged format, each team playing a home and an away match against their opponent. The team which scored more goals on aggregate, was qualifying to the next round. If the two teams scored the same number of goals on aggregate, then the team which scored more goals away from home was advancing to the next round. 
 
If both teams had scored the same number of home and away goals, then extra time was following after the end of the second leg match. If during the extra thirty minutes both teams had managed to score, but they had scored the same number of goals, then the team who scored the away goals was advancing to the next round (i.e. the team which was playing away). If there weren't scored any goals during extra time, the qualifying team was determined by penalty shoot-out.

The final was a single match.

The cup winner secured a place in the 2009–10 UEFA Europa League.

Bracket

First round
In the first round participated all the teams of the Cypriot Second Division and 10 of 14 teams of the Cypriot First Division. The four first division teams which were qualified for 2007–08 Cypriot Cup's semifinals (APOEL, Anorthosis, Apollon, Omonia) did not participated in this round. The Cypriot First Division teams were not drawn together and played the second leg at home.

The draw for the First Round took place on September 10, 2008. The first legs were played on September 23, 24 and October 1, 2008. The second legs were played on October 4 and 5, 2008.

|}

Second round
Teams that qualified for last year's semifinals entered in this round, along with the 12 winners of the previous round. The draw for the second round took place on December 29, 2008. The first legs were played on January 14 and 21, 2009. The second legs were played on January 28 and February 4, 2009.

|}

Quarter-finals
The draw for the quarterfinals took place on February 5, 2009 at the Hilton Park hotel in Nicosia. The first legs were played on February 25 and March 4, 2009. The second legs were played on March 11 and 18, 2009.

|}

Semi-finals
The draw for the semifinals took place at the Hilton Park hotel in Nicosia on March 20, 2009. The first legs were played on April 15, 2009. The second legs were played on May 6, 2009.

First legs

Second legs

AEL won 3–2 on aggregate

APOP Kinyras Peyias won 2–1 on aggregate

Final

Sources

See also
 Cypriot Cup
 2008–09 Cypriot First Division
 2008–09 Cypriot Second Division

Cypriot Cup seasons
Cyprus
Cup